Johannes of Cologne may refer to:

 Juan de Colonia, architect
 John of Cologne, priest and a saint